Oyindamola Fakeye is a Nigerian  creative producer currently working with VAN Lagos. She trained as a curator at Centre for Contemporary Art, Lagos.

Life
She graduated from University of Nottingham.
With Emeka Ogboh and Jude Anogwih, she founded and directs Video Art Network, in Lagos.

Workshops
 ‘Party Games’ 2014 
 David Dale Gallery, Glasgow 2014 
 WHO IS WEARING MY T-SHIRT, Lagos, 2010

References

External links
http://vanlagos.blogspot.com/
http://universes-in-universe.org/eng/nafas/articles/2012/pret_a_partager/photos/12_zohra_opoku

Nigerian curators
Nigerian producers
Alumni of the University of Nottingham
Nigerian women curators